The Bahrain national cricket team is the team that represents the country of Bahrain in international cricket. The team is organised by the Bahrain Cricket Association (BCA), which became an ICC affiliate member in 2001 and an associate member in 2017.

History

Early History
Cricket has been played in Bahrain since the early 20th century. The earliest instance of Cricket was recorded in 1932 when a match was played between Royal British Airforce and Royal British Navy. In 1935, the Awali Cricket Club was formed by the then British Oil Company which is now BAPCO – Bahrain Petroleum Company.

The Bahraini national side made its first international appearance in 1979, at an invitational tournament with Kuwait, Qatar, and Sharjah (one of the United Arab Emirates).

20th Century
Its first appearance in an Asian Cricket Council tournament came at the 2004 ACC Trophy in Malaysia; since then, Bahrain has regularly appeared in ACC events. Bahrain has also made several appearances in World Cricket League tournaments, but was relegated back to regional tournaments after finishing fifth at the 2013 Division Six event.

2018-Present
In April 2018, the ICC decided to grant full Twenty20 International (T20I) status to all its members. Therefore, all Twenty20 matches played between Bahrain and other ICC members after 1 January 2019 will be a full T20I. 

Bahrain made its Twenty20 International debut on 20 January 2019, defeating Saudi Arabia by 41 runs in the 2019 ACC Western Region T20 at Al Emarat Cricket Stadium, Muscat, Oman.

Tournament history

ICC T20 World Cup Qualifier 
 2022: 6th place (Qualifier A)

Asia Cup Qualifier 
2018: Did not participate
2020: Did not qualify

ACC Western Region T20
2019: 3rd place
2020: Semi-finals

ACC Trophy
2006: Quarter-finals

ACC Trophy Elite
2008: 7th place

World Cricket League
2009
Division Seven: Winners
Division Six: Runners up
2010
Division Five: 3rd place
2012
Division Five: 5th place
2013
Division Six: 5th place

ACC Twenty20 Cup
2009: 11th place

Current squad

This lists all the players who have played for Bahrain in the past 12 months or has been part of the latest T20I squad. Updated as of 23 December 2022.

Records

International Match Summary — Bahrain
 
Last updated 12 March 2023

Twenty20 International 

 Highest team total: 195/7 v. Canada on 14 November 2022 at Oman Cricket Academy Ground Turf 1.
 Highest individual score: 82*, Muhammad Younis v Qatar on 23 October 2021 at West End Park International Cricket Stadium, Doha.
 Best individual bowling figures: 5/5, Junaid Aziz v. Germany on 18 February 2022 at Oman Cricket Academy Ground Turf 2.

Most T20I runs for Bahrain

Most T20I wickets for Bahrain

T20I record versus other nations

Records complete to T20I #2021. Last updated 12 March 2023.

Partners
Solo Sport
Teird Sport
Diyar Al Muharraq
HSBC Bank Middle East
Mashreq Bank Bahrain
Kuwait Finance House
National Bank of Bahrain
Bank of Bahrain and Kuwait
Bank Muscat
Khaleeji Commercial Bank
GFH Financial Group
Citi Islamic Investment Bank
Bank Al-Khair
Bank of Khartoum
Bahrain Islamic Bank
Al Salam Bank
Al Baraka Banking Group
Al Baraka Islamic Bank
ABC Islamic Bank
Kuwait Turkish Participation Bank Inc.
Liquidity Management Centre
RA Bahrain
Arcapita Group
Venture Capital Bank
Viva Bahrain
Stc Bahrain
Zain Bahrain
Batelco
Bahrain Radio and Television Corporation
Television in Bahrain
Bahrain Sports TV
Cryo Temp Bahrain
Cryo Temp Recovery Bahrain
Visit Bahrain
Gulf Air
Bahrain Air
DHL International Aviation ME
Comlux Middle East
Texel Air
Gulf Aviation
Gulf Traveller
Swiftair Bahrain
Bahrain International Airport
Muharraq Airfield
Sakhir Air Base
Isa Air Base
Furata Water Bahrain

See also
 List of Bahrain Twenty20 International cricketers
 Bahrain women's national cricket team

References

Cricket in Bahrain
National cricket teams
Cricket
Bahrain in international cricket